Tropical Storm Bebinca was a weak but erratic and long-lived tropical cyclone that affected South China and Vietnam in mid-August 2018. Bebinca originated from a tropical depression over the South China Sea on August 9. Maintaining this intensity for a few days near the Guangdong coast, the system intensified into a tropical storm south of Jiangmen on August 13. The storm moved slowly to the east and then curved back on the next day, before making landfall in the Leizhou Peninsula on August 15. Bebinca crossed the Gulf of Tonkin and made landfall in Vietnam on August 16, before dissipated on the next day.

In China, 6 people were dead and the economic losses by the storm reached ¥2.31 billion (US$333 million). In Vietnam, Bebinca killed 13 people. Moderate damage to agriculture and infrastructure were reported in Northern Vietnam, with heavy rains caused multiple landslides and blocked the road. Total damage in Vietnam were over ₫1.34 trillion (US$57.6 million).

Meteorological history

Late on August 9, the Japan Meteorological Agency (JMA) began to monitor a tropical depression over the South China Sea. The system generally moved northward slowly under a subtropical ridge, and then turned to northeast on the next day. Despite moving over warm waters, the depression remained poorly organized. It moved ashore near Hailing Island, Yangjiang, Guangdong Province at 10:35 a.m. CST on August 11 (02:35 UTC). The depression made an anti-clockwise loop inland and moved back to the sea later that day. The system moved slowly southeastward, because Yagi and Leepi in the northwestern Pacific prohibited the extension of the subtropical ridge, therefore the steering current remained weak for days in the South China Sea. After moving back to the sea, the depression gained some organization, and the Joint Typhoon Warning Center (JTWC) finally classified it as a tropical depression and gave the numerical designation 20W on August 12. After maintaining tropical depression status for more than 3 days, 20W finally intensified to a tropical storm and the JMA gave the international name Bebinca early on August 13. Throughout that day, Bebinca's low-level circulation center (LLCC) was exposed because of moderate to strong easterly wind shear. Despite this, the JTWC upgraded the system to a tropical storm later that day.

Bebinca remained a sheared cyclone on August 14, while continued to slowly drifting to the east. After Leepi made landfall in Japan and dissipated, the subtropical ridge can finally extend and build over China, and Bebinca began to curve back to the west. Bebinca made its second landfall in Leizhou, Guangdong at 9:40 p.m. CST (13:40 UTC), and emerged to the Gulf of Tonkin about four hours later. Once moving into the warm waters of the Gulf of Tonkin, Bebinca began another intensification trend. This prompted the JMA to upgrade Bebinca to a severe tropical storm, but it was revoked in the post-storm analysis. Bebinca weakened slightly before making its third and final landfall in Tĩnh Gia District, Thanh Hóa Province, Vietnam at 5:30 a.m. ICT on August 17 (22:30 UTC on August 16), with winds of 75 km/h (45 mph). Bebinca weakened quickly once moving inland, and the JTWC issued its final warning early on August 17. The JMA also downgraded Bebinca to a tropical depression, and Bebinca dissipated later that day, over Laos.

Preparation and impacts

China
As Bebinca meandering near the Guangdong coast, the agency urged that the northern part of the island were still affected by the strong winds and heavy rainfall on August 12–13.

Due to the slow movement of Bebinca, Hainan Island was affected by extremely heavy rains. Through out the country, 6 people were dead and the economic loss were at ¥2.31 billion (US$333 million).

Hong Kong
The Hong Kong Observatory (HKO) issued the standby typhoon signal No. 1 at 5:15 p.m. HKT on August 9. Because of the slow movement of Bebinca, the standby typhoon signal No. 1 was hoisted for more than four days, the second-longest in recorded history. As Bebinca began to approach the Guangdong coast, the HKO raised the typhoon signal to No. 3 early on August 14. The HKO has warned that low-lying areas may be prone to flooding or backflow of seawater because of storm surge, and that members of the public should stay away from the shoreline due to rough seas.

Macau
The Meteorological and Geophysical Bureau (SMG) issued the signal No. 1 at 5:00 p.m. MST on August 9. As Bebinca began to approach the Zhujiang Delta, the SMG raised the signal to No. 3 early on August 11. Similar to Hong Kong, due to the slow movement of the storm, the signal No. 3 remained hoisted for more than three days, until it was replaced by signal No. 8 late on August 14. This broke the longest storm signal hoisted in recorded history.

Vietnam
The storm brought strong winds and heavy rains to the region, killing 10 people and 3 went missing. Besides, Bebinca damaged thousands of houses, causing moderate damage to agriculture. Heavy rains triggered numerous landslides and lead to some road accidents. Damages in Nghệ An Province were at ₫1.341 trillion (US$57.6 million).

See also

Other cyclones named Bebinca
Weather of 2018
Tropical cyclones in 2018
Tropical Storm Amy (1994)
Tropical Storm Dianmu (2016)
Tropical Storm Nock-ten (2011)
Tropical Storm Son-Tinh (2018)

References

External links

 JMA General Information of Tropical Storm Bebinca (1816) from Digital Typhoon
JMA Best Track Data of Tropical Storm Bebinca (1816) 
20W.BEBINCA from the U.S. Naval Research Laboratory

2018 Pacific typhoon season
2018 disasters in China
Typhoons in China
2018 disasters in Vietnam
Typhoons in Vietnam
August 2018 events in Asia
Western Pacific tropical storms
Tropical cyclones in 2018